The 2010 season is Bolivar's  33rd consecutive season in the Liga de Fútbol Profesional Boliviano, and 85th year in existence as a football club. To see more news about Bolivar see Bolivar Official Website

Squad
For Liga de Fútbol Profesional Boliviano 2010

Top scorers

Includes all competitive matches. The list is sorted by shirt number when total goals are equal.

Last updated on 7 July

Copa Aerosur

Play-off Round

|}

First Leg

Second Leg

Semi-final

|}

1st Leg

2nd Leg

Final

|}

Copa Libertadores

Matches

Torneo Apertura

Serie B
Standings

Results by round

Matches

Winner's Hexagonal
Standings

Results by round

Torneo Invierno

First stage

Second stage
For the second stage, if a tie in points exists after the end of the second leg, the match will go directly into a penalty shootout as per the Laws of the Game.

Semifinals

Torneo Clausura

Standings

Results by round

Notes and references

2010
Bolivian football clubs 2010 season

es:Club Bolivar
fr:Bolivar